Sascha Dikiciyan, known professionally as Sonic Mayhem, is a German game musician, producer and professional sound designer of Armenian origin, who has produced the soundtrack for Quake II, Tomorrow Never Dies and Hellgate: London, as well as approximately half of the soundtrack for Quake III Arena and all the weapon sound effects for Unreal Tournament and, since the build 222 patch, also its predecessor, Unreal. Dikiciyan has also produced independent music albums.

Dikiciyan's style is primarily a very driving and forceful form of aggro-industrial, with an emphasis on repeated musical phrases (though this is less pronounced in his non-soundtrack work).  Currently Sascha collaborates with Cris Velasco who is responsible for orchestral moods in their music.

Dikiciyan is also known under the name Toksin, producing dance remixes for the likes of BT and Celldweller and many others.

Dikiciyan's work came to prominence when he sent a copy of his first CD Methods of Destruction, an alternate Quake soundtrack, to id Software in 1996. As a result, John Romero asked him personally to score the soundtrack for Quake II.

Dikiciyan has also contributed sound patches to Moog Music's award-winning Animoog app.

Works

References

External links

Sonic Mayhem website
Steinberg Tron Evolution interview
Artist profile at OverClocked ReMix
GameSlice Interview: The Music of Quake <- Broken link
Sascha Dikiciyan Interview at Tracksounds
Interview at GamesArt.de

1970 births
Living people
German industrial musicians
Video game composers
Musicians from Stuttgart
German people of Armenian descent